Trentham Boat Club is a rowing club based on Trentham Lake next to the River Trent, at Trentham Gardens Estate, Stone Road, Trentham, Stoke-on-Trent, Staffordshire.

History
The club is relatively new being founded in 2004 but has produced ten national champions.

Honours

National champions

Key
 J junior
 2, 4, 8 crew size
 18, 16, 15, 14 age group
 x sculls
 - coxless
 + coxed

References

Sport in Staffordshire
Sport in Stoke-on-Trent
Rowing clubs in England